SACD, founded as Société des Auteurs et Compositeurs Dramatiques on 7 March 1829, is a French collecting society, undertaking collective rights management for authors. The Society manages, promotes and protects the performance rights of theatrical, audiovisual or photographic works for their creators by collecting royalties and authorising performances. It's also one of the main lobbies against "droit d'auteur" (copyright) changes and to protect the activities of collective rights management societies.

History

The SACD was founded in 1829 by French dramatist and miscellaneous writer Charles-Guillaume Étienne. The idea of society protecting the rights of the authors dates back to Beaumarchais, who founded his own organization in 1777.

Current activities

In 2006 the Society represented about 44,000 members in the performing arts and audiovisual sectors. The entire SACD repertoire currently comprises about 500,000 works, from the performing arts and the audiovisual sector.

The SACD lobbies in favor of governmental action meant to discourage unauthorized use of copyrighted works over the Internet (DADVSI, HADOPI) and against proposals to establish a "global license", authorizing French Internet users to copy copyrighted works in exchange for a flat fee on the Internet subscription.

In 2009, the SACD hosted a petition in favor of Roman Polanski, following his arrest for failure to appear in a California court for sentencing after pleading guilty to one count of statutory rape of a 13-year-old girl.

The SACD gives a prize to one of the feature films competing at the Critics' Week sidebar of the Cannes Film Festival.

References

External links

The English-language web-site

1829 establishments in France
Trade associations based in France
Organizations established in 1829